The Middle Ramu or Annaberg languages are a small language family of Madang Province, Papua New Guinea. It is no longer accepted as a valid grouping by Glottolog, but is accepted by Foley (2018).

Wurm (1982) classified Aian, at his 'family' level, in a more distant stock-level relationship with Rao (Annaberg):
Annaberg
Rao (Annaberg)
Aian family: Anor, Aiome

The Annaberg family is generally classified among the Ramu languages of northern Papua New Guinea.

References

External links 
 Timothy Usher, New Guinea World, Proto–Middle Ramu River

 
Ramu languages
Languages of Madang Province